The Washington D.C. Area Film Critics Association (WAFCA) is a group of film critics based in Washington, D.C., and founded in 2002. WAFCA is composed of nearly 50 D.C.-based film critics from internet, print, radio, and television. Annually, the group gives awards to the best in film as selected by its members by vote.

Categories
 Best Actor
 Best Actress
 Best Adapted Screenplay
 Best Animated Feature
 Best Art Direction
 Best Breakthrough Performance
 Best Cinematography
 Best Director
 Best Documentary
 Best Ensemble
 Best Film
 Best Foreign Language Film
 Best Original Screenplay
 Best Score
 Best Supporting Actor
 Best Supporting Actress

Ceremonies
 2002
 2003
 2004
 2005
 2006
 2007
 2008
 2009
 2010
 2011
 2012
 2013
 2014
 2015
 2016
 2017
 2018
 2019
 2020
 2021
 2022

Awards breakdown

Films with two or more

7
 La La Land (2016) – Best Film, Best Director, Best Original Screenplay, Best Cinematography, Best Editing, Best Production Design, Best Score

6
 12 Years a Slave (2013) – Best Film, Best Actor, Best Supporting Actress, Best Adapted Screenplay, Best Ensemble, Best Score
 Nomadland (2020) – Best Film, Best Director, Best Actress, Best Adapted Screenplay, Best Cinematography, Best Editing

5
 Birdman or (The Unexpected Virtue of Ignorance) (2014) – Best Actor, Best Original Screenplay, Best Ensemble, Best Cinematography, Best Editing

4
 Boyhood (2014) – Best Film, Best Director, Best Supporting Actress, Best Youth Performance
 Eternal Sunshine of the Spotless Mind (2004) – Best Film, Best Director, Best Original Screenplay, Best Ensemble
 Inception (2010) – Best Original Screenplay, Best Art Direction, Best Cinematography, Best Score
 No Country for Old Men (2007) – Best Film, Best Director, Best Supporting Actor, Best Ensemble
 Roma (2018) – Best Film, Best Director, Best Cinematography, Best Foreign Language Film
 Slumdog Millionaire (2008) – Best Film, Best Director, Best Adapted Screenplay, Best Breakthrough Performance

3
 Parasite - Best Film, Best Director, Best Foreign Language Film
 The Social Network (2010) – Best Film, Best Director, Best Adapted Screenplay
 Up in the Air (2009) – Best Film, Best Actor, Best Adapted Screenplay
 Zero Dark Thirty (2012) – Best Film, Best Director, Best Actress

2
 21 Grams (2003) – Best Actress, Best Supporting Actor
 The Artist (2011) – Best Film, Best Score
 Capote (2005) – Best Actor, Best Adapted Screenplay
 Crash (2005) – Best Original Screenplay, Best Ensemble
 Doubt (2008) – Best Actress, Best Ensemble
 Dreamgirls (2006) – Best Supporting Actress, Best Breakthrough Performance
 The Fighter (2010) – Best Supporting Actor, Best Supporting Actress
 The Hurt Locker (2009) – Best Director, Best Ensemble
 Hugo (2011) – Best Director, Best Art Direction
 Inglourious Basterds (2009) – Best Supporting Actor, Best Original Screenplay
 Les Misérables (2012) – Best Supporting Actress, Best Ensemble
 Little Miss Sunshine (2006) – Best Original Screenplay, Best Ensemble
 The Lord of the Rings: The Return of the King (2003) – Best Film, Best Director
 Lost in Translation (2003) – Best Actor, Best Original Screenplay
 Minari (2020) –  Best Supporting Actress, Best Youth Performance
 Munich (2005) – Best Film, Best Director
 Precious (2009) – Best Supporting Actress, Best Breakthrough Performance
 The Revenant (2015) – Best Actor, Best Cinematography
 Road to Perdition (2002) – Best Film, Best Director

People with two or more
3
 George Clooney – Best Actor: Michael Clayton (2007), Up in the Air (2009), and The Descendants (2011)
Frances McDormand – Best Actress:Three Billboards Outside Ebbing, Missouri (2018), Nomadland (2021)  and Best Ensemble: Three Billboards Outside Ebbing, Missouri (2018)

2
 Amy Adams – Best Supporting Actress: Junebug (2005); Best Ensemble: Doubt (2008)
 Javier Bardem – Best Supporting Actor & Best Ensemble: No Country for Old Men (2007)
 Jamie Foxx – Best Actor: Ray (2004); Best Supporting Actor: Collateral (2004)
 Anne Hathaway – Best Supporting Actress & Best Ensemble: Les Misérables (2012)
 Terrence Howard – Best Breakthrough Performance: Hustle & Flow (2005); Best Ensemble: Crash (2005)
 Jennifer Hudson – Best Breakthrough Performance & Best Supporting Actress: Dreamgirls (2006)
 Carey Mulligan – Best Actress: An Education (2009); Best Ensemble: Pride & Prejudice (2005)
 Jason Reitman – Best Adapted Screenplay: Thank You for Smoking (2006) & Up in the Air (2009)
 Aaron Sorkin – Best Adapted Screenplay: Charlie Wilson's War (2007) & The Social Network (2010)
 Meryl Streep – Best Actress & Best Ensemble: Doubt (2008)

References

External links
 Official website

 
American film critics associations
Culture of Washington, D.C.
Mass media in Washington, D.C.
Organizations based in Washington, D.C.
Organizations established in 2002
2002 establishments in Washington, D.C.